Susan Rook (born ) is a journalist best known for her years as a CNN anchor and original Host of CNN's Talkback Live.

Rook started anchoring overnight news cutins, then moved up to more visible anchor assignments: co-anchoring "Newsnight" with Patrick Emory and later PrimeNews and "Evening News" (later renamed to World News), co-anchoring with Bernard Shaw and later hosting the topical daily talk show TalkBack Live.  Rook was one of the three panelists, along with Helen Thomas and Gene Gibbons, in the 3rd 1992 United States presidential election debate with then president George H. W. Bush and future president Bill Clinton.  She was also a general assignment reporter in New Orleans and Ft Myers, FL before coming to CNN.  She is a graduate of George Mason University

She originally turned down the offer to Anchor on CNN.  She took the job after the News Director in New Orleans spiked her investigative story about political corruption.  She turned the story over to Ron Ridenhour (an investigative reporter for City Business).  Ridenhour was the soldier who sent the letter to Congress that sparked the investigation into the My Lai Massacre.

Ridenhour won the Polk Award for his articles beginning with "T ax Dodge: Millions Go Uncollected; City Hall Protects The Favored Few".  Ridenhour's refusal to give up confidential sources ended up before the Louisiana Supreme Court.

The Ridenhour Prizes "recognize those who persevere in acts of truth-telling that protect the public interest, promote social justice or illuminate a more just vision of society."

Susan Rook says, "My proudest professional achievement remains uncovering the story that doesn't bear my name.  This started because a kid died in a fire right down the street from a firehouse closed because of NOLA City budget issues.  This was a poor, black kid.  The powers that be didn't care.  My source cared.  I cared.  Ron cared.  There must be something larger than merely self in order to live a fulfilling life."

Early life 

Susan Rook was born  to Bill, a CIA psychologist, and Edie, a teacher; her brother Bill was born about a year earlier. She was homeschooled for much of her young life and skipped the 6th and 12th grades. As a result, she was younger than normal when she began attending George Mason University.

Career 

Rook was a reporter for WBBH-TV in Fort Myers, Florida, and WVUE-TV in New Orleans, Louisiana, before she was hired at CNN in 1987.

On October 19, 1992, Rook was a panelist, alongside Gene Gibbons of Reuters and Helen Thomas of UPI, for the third debate of the 1992 presidential election, hosted by Jim Lehrer of The MacNeil/Lehrer NewsHour on PBS.  C-Span interviewed Rook about her Presidential Debate experience.

Rook was inducted into Omicron Delta Kappa, the National Leadership Honor Society at East Tennessee State University in 1994 as an honoris causa initiate.

At CNN, Rook co-hosted CNN PrimeNews with Bernard Shaw and was the host of Talkback Live from its inception in 1994.

Rook left CNN in 1997. She hosted a panel on education for the Republican Governors Association in November 1998.

Rook was a part of the coverage of the millennium celebrations for PBS in 1999–2000.

Personal life 

Rook married Ed Turner, former executive vice president of CNN, in 1993. They divorced in 1994. Turner died of cancer in 2002.

Rook is a recovering alcoholic and drug addict.

In 2000, Rook traveled to Nepal and climbed to the base camp of Mount Everest.

References

External links 
 CNN biography entry
 C-Span Presidential Debate analysis interview of Susan Rook.

American television news anchors
Living people
George Mason University alumni
CNN people
1961 births